Igor Vladimirovich Podgorskiy ( (September 4, 1922 – December 26, 1975)  was one of the greatest Soviet animators, who worked in the "Golden Era" of Soviet animation. He contributed to more than one hundred cartoons. Many of these cartoons have become The International and The National Classics.

Filmography
1955—The Enchanted Boy(Заколдованный мальчик)
1956—The Ugly Duckling (Гадкий утёнок)
1957—The Snow Queen (Снежная королева) 
1958—Gribok-teremok (Грибок-теремок)
1960—The Adventures of Buratino (Приключения Буратино) 
1960—It Was I Who Drew the Little Man (Человечка нарисовал я)
1961—The Key (Ключ)
1970—Kanikuly Bonifatsiya (Каникулы Бонифация)
1970—Film, Film, Film (Фильм, Фильм, Фильм)

References

External links

Russian animators
Soviet animators
Soviet animation directors
1922 births
1975 deaths